Tasmania is the smallest and southernmost state of Australia. The Tasmanian mainland itself is an island, with an area of  - 94.1% of the total land area of the state. About 1000 smaller islands make up the remaining  of total land area.

Classification structure
A considerable number of Tasmanian islands are identified as being in island groups, including the Breaksea, Furneaux, Hogan, Hunter, Kent, Maatsuyker, Mutton Bird, New Year, Swainson, Trumpeter, and Waterhouse groups.

Regions
Similar to Regions of Tasmania the islands are generally distinguished by the coast that they are adjacent to, as well as Bass Strait - the main separation from the mainland state of Victoria. Five regions are aligned to the north coast and Bass Strait - North West Islands (including King Island), North Coast Islands, North Bass Strait Islands, Furneaux Islands, and North East Islands. The southern groups are South and West Islands, and East Coast Islands.

Status
There are 334 islands within the state of Tasmania. Only sixteen of these 334 islands are listed as private islands. The majority of these sixteen private islands have a conservation covenant associated with their title restricting future development, whilst a small minority have a freehold title.

List of islands

Notes
: Combined  data for North Bruny and South Bruny Islands.
:  data is for the entire Flinders Council (Furneaux Group) which includes Cape Barren Island and Clarke Island.
: Errol Anderson, family arrived on Vansittart Cutter, island was named for, 26 January 1836, Hobart Town.
: Source: Direct observation by editor

See also

 Tasmania's offshore islands

References

External links
Map of Tasmania with smaller islands marked (PDF)

Tasmania
 
Islands